Odontostomops normalops, the Undistinguished sabertooth, is a species of sabertooth fish found in the oceanic depth from .  This species grows to a length of  SL.  This species is the only known member of its genus.

References
 

Evermannellidae
Monotypic fish genera
Fish described in 1928